Agrupación Deportiva Mar Menor-San Javier was a Spanish football team based in San Javier, in the Region of Murcia. Founded in 1980, it last played in Tercera División - Group 13, holding home matches at Estadio Pitín, with a capacity of 3,000 seats.

History
Founded in 1980, Mar Menor first reached the national categories eight years later, and would remain in Tercera División for the remainder of its existence, safe for two (consecutive) years in Segunda División B.

In the summer of 2007, the team disappeared due to financial problems.

Seasons

2 seasons in Segunda División B
17 seasons in Tercera División

Famous players

References

External links
Official website 

Association football clubs established in 1980
Defunct football clubs in the Region of Murcia
Association football clubs disestablished in 2007
San Javier, Murcia
1980 establishments in Spain
2007 disestablishments in Spain